The 1959 Grand National was the 113th renewal of the Grand National horse race that took place at Aintree Racecourse near Liverpool, on 21 March 1959.

The race was won by the 8/1 second-favourite Oxo, ridden by Michael Scudamore and trained by Willie Stephenson. Thirty-four horses ran, including the previous year's winner Mr. What, who finished third. Wyndburgh was second and Tiberetta was the only other finisher, each finishing in the places for the third consecutive year.

There was one equine fatality during the race: Henry Purcell, who was one of fourteen horses to fall or be brought down at Becher's Brook. Additionally, Slippery Serpent broke a bone in his leg in falling at the thirteenth fence and was euthanised during the week after the race. A debate was held in parliament and the Home Secretary, Rab Butler, met the National Hunt Committee in response to safety concerns raised by the League Against Cruel Sports.

Finishing order

Non-finishers

First to be filmed in colour?
The Cinema series 'Look at Life' followed Oxo to Aintree and filmed the National in colour, claiming to be the first time the race was screened in such a way.

Post race controversy
The debate regarding the safety of the race rolled into June when Mirabel Topham issued a rebuke of a claim that twenty-four horses had been injured during the race. Mrs Topham reported that every horse was checked by three stable lads after the race who reported that Mr What had an abrasion, Tiberetta a scratch and Eternal a cut lip.  Daily Mirror, Page 5, Column 2, Article 'Horses like the Grand National. Says Mrs T.'

References

 1959
Grand National
Grand National
Grand National
20th century in Lancashire